"We're Not Gonna Sleep Tonight" is a song by English recording artist Emma Bunton from her debut solo album, A Girl Like Me (2001). Written by Bunton and Rhett Lawrence, the track was released in the United Kingdom as the album's third and final single on 10 December 2001. It debuted and peaked at number 20 on the UK Singles Chart, becoming the album's lowest-peaking single. The music video for the song was directed by Phil Griffin.

Track listings
UK CD single
 "We're Not Gonna Sleep Tonight"  – 3:10
 "We're Not Gonna Sleep Tonight"  – 6:38
 "Let Your Baby Show You How to Move" – 3:07

UK DVD single
 Emma Introduces Her New Video – 0:30
 "We're Not Gonna Sleep Tonight"  – 3:10
 "Let Your Baby Show You How to Move"  – 3:07
 "We're Not Gonna Sleep Tonight"  – 3:23
 Emma Talks About Making Her Video – 0:30
 Emma Talks About Making Her Video – 0:30
 Emma Talks About Making Her Video – 0:30

Charts

References

2001 singles
2001 songs
Emma Bunton songs
Song recordings produced by Rhett Lawrence
Songs written by Emma Bunton
Songs written by Rhett Lawrence
Virgin Records singles